The Pioneers' Party was a political party in Indonesia. It was founded in 2002 and was initially led by Rachmawati Sukarnoputri, a daughter of Indonesia's first president, Sukarno, and sister of former Indonesian president Megawati. It contested the 2009 elections, but received only 0.3 percent of the vote, well below the threshold of 2.5% of the political votes, and was awarded no seats in the People's Representative Council. Following its poor result in the 2009 vote, the party joined nine other smaller parties to form the National Unity Party.

References

Defunct political parties in Indonesia
Political parties established in 2002
2002 establishments in Indonesia
Political parties disestablished in 2009
2009 disestablishments in Indonesia